Harengula is a genus of herrings that occur mostly in the western Atlantic, Gulf of Mexico and the Caribbean Sea, with one species in the eastern Pacific Ocean. There are currently four described species.

Species
 Harengula clupeola (Cuvier, 1829) (False herring)
 Harengula humeralis (Cuvier, 1829) (Redear herring)
 Harengula jaguana Poey, 1865 (Scaled herring)
 Harengula thrissina (D. S. Jordan & C. H. Gilbert, 1882) (Pacific flatiron herring)

References
 

Clupeidae
Marine fish genera
Taxa named by Achille Valenciennes